Divinyls were an Australian rock band that were formed in Sydney in 1980. The band primarily consisted of vocalist Chrissy Amphlett and guitarist Mark McEntee. Amphlett garnered widespread attention for performing on stage in a school uniform and fishnet stockings, and she often used an illuminated neon tube as a prop for displaying aggression towards both band members and the audience.
Originally a five-piece, the band underwent numerous line-up changes, with Amphlett and McEntee remaining as core members, before its dissolution in 1996.

In May 2001, the Australasian Performing Right Association (APRA), as part of its 75th-anniversary celebrations, named "Science Fiction" as one of the Top 30 Australian songs of all time. The band was inducted into the Australian Recording Industry Association (ARIA) Hall of Fame in 2006 and in late 2007 Amphlett and McEntee reconvened to record a new single and begin working on a new album. The band played a short series of live gigs in Australia in late 2007 and early 2008. Divinyls broke up in 2009, and Amphlett died in 2013.

Divinyls released five studio albums—four placed in the Top 10 Australian chart, while one (Divinyls) reached No. 15 in the United States (US) and No. 33 for 3 weeks in Canada. Their biggest-selling single "I Touch Myself" (1990) achieved a No. 1 ranking in Australia, No. 4 in the United States, No. 10 in the United Kingdom (UK), and No. 13 in Canada.

Career

1980s: Formation, Desperate, What a Life! & Temperamental
Amphlett was the cousin of 1960s Australian pop icon Patricia "Little Pattie" Amphlett. In her autobiography Pleasure and Pain (2005), Amphlett described breaking into the music scene from the age of fourteen, being arrested for busking when seventeen and travelling in Spain, and how her performances drew upon childhood pain.

Amphlett and guitarist Mark McEntee were introduced by Jeremy Paul (ex-Air Supply) in the car park of a small music venue in Collaroy, Sydney, after Amphlett and Paul had finished a gig with their then band, Batonrouge. Amphlett and McEntee met again at the Sydney Opera House where Amphlett and Paul were singing in a choral concert in 1980. They recruited keyboardist Bjarne Ohlin later in 1980 and drummer Richard Harvey in 1981, respectively, and for almost two years they performed in pubs and clubs in Sydney's Kings Cross. During this time, Paul negotiated publishing and recording agreements that led to the band signing with WEA. Australian film director Ken Cameron saw Divinyls performing in a club. This led to them providing the soundtrack for his 1982 film Monkey Grip and also gave Amphlett, Paul and McEntee supporting roles in the movie. The group released two singles from the soundtrack, Music from Monkey Grip EP, "Boys in Town", which reached No. 8 on the national singles chart, and "Only Lonely". The band was the opening act at the 1983 US Festival.

After the band's initial success, original manager and bassist Jeremy Paul left. He was replaced on bass, briefly by Ken Firth (ex-The Ferrets) and more permanently by Rick Grossman (ex-Matt Finish). Grossman left in 1987 to replace Clyde Bramley in Hoodoo Gurus. By early 1988, Divinyls consisted of Amphlett and McEntee with augmentation by additional musicians when recording or touring.

Over the decade Divinyls released four albums, Music from Monkey Grip EP on WEA in 1982, Desperate on Chrysalis Records in 1983, What a Life! in 1985 and Temperamental in 1988. The latter two albums were also released by Chrysalis in the United States. They had hit singles in Australia with, "Science Fiction" No. 13 in 1983, "Good Die Young" No. 32 in 1984 and "Pleasure and Pain" which was written by Holly Knight and Mike Chapman and went No. 11 in 1985. Their later manager Vince Lovegrove organised Divinyls' transfer from WEA to Chrysalis and their first tours of the United States. They established a fan base there, without achieving major commercial success. Divinyls also had Australian hits with cover versions of The Easybeats' "I'll Make You Happy", and Syndicate of Sound's "Hey Little Boy" ("Hey Little Girl" with the gender switched) which reached No. 25 in 1988. Amphlett became a controversial and highly visible celebrity for her brash, overtly sexual persona and subversive humour in lyrics, performances and media interviews.

Image transformation
At the start of their popularity, Divinyls were considered to be a hard rock band. At some point, many fans referred to Amphlett as the female Angus Young, as both had similar mannerisms on stage and wore black-and-white school uniforms while performing in the early 1980s. The band's image gradually changed after the release of the album What a Life! when the band began wearing elaborate clothing and producing more songs in the pop music genre. By the time of the release of their album Temperamental, Divinyls' image had changed to a glamour fashion style where they produced modern pop music.

1990s: diVINYLS & Underworld
In 1991, Divinyls released diVINYLS on Virgin Records and the single "I Touch Myself" which became their only Australian No.1 single. The song reached No. 4 in the United States and No. 10 in the United Kingdom. The majority of Divinyls' hits were co-written by Amphlett and McEntee, but in this case they wrote with Tom Kelly and Billy Steinberg. diVINYLS reached No. 5 on the Australian album charts and No. 15 on Billboard Top 200. The drummer for the diVINYLS sessions was Charley Drayton, who became romantically involved with Amphlett: they married in July 1999, and from 2000, lived together in New York. A disagreement with Virgin Records stifled future development outside Australia where they released popular albums and achieved two more top twenty singles with "I Ain't Gonna Eat Out My Heart Anymore" No. 19 in 1992 and "I'm Jealous" No. 14 in 1995. During the 1980s and 1990s Amphlett collaborated as a songwriter with other artists including Chrissie Hynde and Cyndi Lauper, and both Amphlett and McEntee worked on solo projects.

A live album, Divinyls Live, was released in 1991 but Divinyls did not provide another studio album for five years. In the early 1990s, they recorded a series of cover songs for various movie soundtracks, including the Young Rascals' "I Ain't Gonna Eat Out My Heart Anymore" for Buffy the Vampire Slayer (1992), the Wild Ones' "Wild Thing" for Reckless Kelly (1993), and Roxy Music's "Love Is the Drug" for Super Mario Brothers (1993).

The song "I Touch Myself" caused such a controversy it had trouble getting airplay in many US-area markets; so much to the point that while performing their song live in Texas at Austin Aqua Fest 1991 the plug was pulled on the band mid-set by organisers.

It wasn't until 1996 that their fifth studio album, Underworld, was released in Australia by BMG. Despite the success of diVINYLS, Virgin had not kept them under contract and BMG did not release Underworld in the United States. As with What a Life!, they worked with three producers, beginning with Peter Collins recording "I'm Jealous" in Nashville, followed by Keith Forsey for "Sex Will Keep Us Together" and "Heart of Steel". Although "Heart of Steel" was chosen as a single, Divinyls discontinued working with Forsey because according to Amphlett "he was a bit too 'pop' for us" and remaining tracks were produced by their drummer Drayton. By the end of 1996, Amphlett and McEntee had a falling out and separated without formally disbanding Divinyls.

1998–2005: After the separation
Following Underworld, Amphlett pursued a stage career. In 1998, she played the role of Judy Garland in the Australian stage production of the life story of entertainer Peter Allen, titled The Boy from Oz. The production was a success and Amphlett's interpretation of Garland, during her final troubled years, brought her critical acclaim: she was nominated for the Helpmann Award for 'Best Female Actor in a Musical'.

Amphlett and McEntee concentrated on solo projects and collaborations with other artists. Amphlett and Drayton lived in New York City from 2000, while McEntee ran a clothing label, Wheels and Doll Baby, in Perth with his partner, Melanie Greensmith. In November 2005 Amphlett published her autobiography Pleasure and Pain: My Life co-written with Larry Writer; she detailed her achievements, drug and alcohol abuse, love affairs and triumphs while a member of Divinyls.

2006–2012: Hall of Fame and reformation

On 16 August 2006, Divinyls were inducted into the ARIA Hall of Fame and made their first performance for 10 years at the award ceremony. They reformed shortly afterwards and a compilation, Greatest Hits, was released by EMI Music Australia in August 2006. The band recorded four new songs via a satellite link: Amphlett and Drayton at Palm Studios in Las Vegas and McEntee in Perth. A single and B-side, "Don't Wanna Do This"/"Asphyxiated", was released in November 2007, with a third track, "All Pretty Things", released on a compilation album for the Homebake Festival. Amphlett stated that the band would return to the studio to record a full album provided they "survived" their Homebake headline gig and national tour.

They performed during the Australian Idol grand final at the Sydney Opera House, on 25 November 2007, although their performance of "Boys in Town" (also performed by Idol winner Natalie Gauci) had to be repeated after Network Ten's transmission feed was interrupted. A national tour of Australia followed in December 2007 with a touring band featuring Drayton on drums, Jerome Smith on bass, Charlie Owen on guitar and newest member Clayton Doley on keyboards. Amphlett revealed on 7 December 2007 that she had multiple sclerosis in an interview with Richard Wilkins on Network Nine's A Current Affair—nevertheless, she was looking forward to touring with Divinyls. The next day, Divinyls headlined the Homebake music festival where Amphlett displayed an emotional fragility when attempting to get the crowd to sing along with her. In August 2009, Amphlett announced that Divinyls were finished and she had a new band in New York.

2013–present: Death of Amphlett, McLean and abortive reformation
Aged 53 years, Amphlett died on 21 April 2013 at her home in New York City after a protracted battle with breast cancer since 2010. Amphlett stated that she had been unable to receive radiotherapy or chemotherapy as treatment for the cancer due to her multiple sclerosis. Amphlett's cousin Patricia Thompson announced the news in an official public statement: "Our beloved Chrissy peacefully made her transition this morning. Christine Joy Amphlett succumbed to the effects of breast cancer and multiple sclerosis, diseases she vigorously fought with exceptional bravery and dignity." In 2014, some of Australia's leading female artists came together to cover "I Touch Myself" to raise awareness and funds for breast cancer.

In 2017, the band performed a one-off show in Perth with The Preatures' Isabella Manfredi and Jack Moffit joining as guests on lead vocals and rhythm guitar, respectively. McEntee, Grossman and Harvey completed the line-up.

In December 2018, McEntee announced he would be reforming the group with new singer Lauren Ruth Ward, ex-Divinyls guitarist Frank Infante and a new rhythm section for an Australian tour, to begin in 2019. However, this announcement was criticised by Drayton and several fans as an "ultimate disrespect", with Drayton stating that anyone other than Amphlett who fronted the Divinyls should "seek some trustworthy advice". On 6 February 2019, the Australian tour was cancelled.

In early January 2021, former band drummer Warren McLean died. Original drummer Richard Harvey died on July 19, 2022, his passing announced on social media by his bandmate from The Party Boys Paul Christie.

Band members
Final line-up
 Chrissy Amphlett  — lead vocals 
 Mark McEntee — guitar, backing vocals, keyboards 
 Jerome Smith – bass 
 Charley Drayton — drums, percussion, backing vocals, occasional guitar, bass and harmonica 
 Clayton Doley — keyboards, backing vocals 
 Charlie Owen — guitar 

Former members
 Jeremy Paul – bass 
 Richard Harvey – drums 
 Bjarne Ohlin – keyboards, guitar, backing vocals 
 Rick Grossman — bass 
 J. J. Harris — drums 
 Kenny Lyon — keyboards 
 Tommy "Mugs" Cain — drums 
 Tim Millikan – bass 
 Warren McLean – drums 
 Roger Mason – keyboards 
 Tim Powles – drums 
 Randy Jackson — bass 
 Benmont Tench — keyboards 
Touring/substitute musicians
 Ken Firth — bass guitar 
 Matthew Hughes – keyboards, bass guitar 
 Frank Infante — guitar 
 Jim Hilbun – bass 
 Lee Borkman – keyboards, guitar 
 Mark Meyer – drums 
 Duane Jarvis – guitar 
 Randy Wiggins – guitar

Discography

Studio albums:
 1982: Music from Monkey Grip
 1983: Desperate
 1985: What a Life!
 1988: Temperamental
 1991: Divinyls
 1996: Underworld

Awards and nominations

ARIA Music Awards
The ARIA Music Awards is an annual awards ceremony that recognises excellence, innovation, and achievement across all genres of Australian music. They commenced in 1987. Divinyls were inducted into the Hall of Fame in 2006.

|-
| 1991
| "I Touch Myself"
| Single of the Year
| 
|-
| 2006
| Divinyls
| ARIA Hall of Fame
|

Countdown Australian Music Awards
Countdown was an Australian pop music TV series on national broadcaster ABC-TV from 1974–1987, it presented music awards from 1979–1987, initially in conjunction with magazine TV Week. The TV Week / Countdown Awards were a combination of popular-voted and peer-voted awards.

|-
| rowspan="3" |1981
| rowspan="2" | "Boys in Town"
| Best Australian Single
| 
|-
| Best Debut Single
| 
|-
| Themselves
| Best New Talent
| 
|-
| rowspan="2" | 1982
| Monkey Grip
| Best Debut Album
| 
|-
| Chrissy Amphlett (Divinyls)
| Most Popular Female
| 
|-
|1983
| Desperate
| Best Australian Album
| 
|-
| 1984
| Christina Amphlett - "In My Life" (Divinyls)
| Best Female Performance in a Video
| 
|-

MTV Video Music Awards
Originally beginning as an alternative to the Grammy Awards, the MTV Video Music Awards were established in the end of the summer of 1984 by MTV to celebrate the top music videos of the year.

!Ref.
|-
| rowspan=3|1991
| rowspan=3|"I Touch Myself"
| Video of the Year
| 
| rowspan=3|
|-
| Best Group Video
| 
|-
| Viewer's Choice
|

See also 

 Tony Mott

References

Further reading
 Amphlett, Christina; Larry Writer, (November 2005). Pleasure and Pain: My Life. Sydney: Hachette Livre Australia. .
 Stieven-Taylor, Alison, (15 October 2007). Rock chicks : the hottest female rockers from the 1960s to now. Sydney : Rockpool Publishing. .

External links
 Official MySpace page

1980 establishments in Australia
2009 disestablishments in Australia
APRA Award winners
ARIA Hall of Fame inductees
Australian new wave musical groups
Australian rock music groups
ARIA Award winners
Chrysalis Records artists
Musical groups established in 1980
Musical groups disestablished in 1996
Musical groups reestablished in 2006
Musical groups disestablished in 2009
Musical groups from Sydney
New South Wales musical groups
RCA Records artists
Virgin Records artists
Pub rock musical groups
Female-fronted musical groups